Fullmetal Alchemist: Brotherhood, known in Japan as , is the second independent anime adaptation developed by Bones based on the Fullmetal Alchemist manga series by Hiromu Arakawa. Yasuhiro Irie worked as director, and Hiroshi Ōnogi as writer. The series follows the story of two alchemist brothers, Edward and Alphonse Elric, who want to restore their bodies after a disastrous failed attempt to bring their mother back to life through alchemy. Unlike the first anime adaptation, which diverged into a completely original story direction halfway through its run, the second series directly follows all the events of the original manga. Fullmetal Alchemist: Brotherhood comprises a total of 64 episodes, 4 original video animations, and 1 theatrical film.

The series premiered on April 5, 2009, on MBS–TBS's Sunday 5:30 p.m. JST anime timeblock, replacing Mobile Suit Gundam 00. It received its English language premiere five days later on Animax Asia, with Japanese audio and English subtitles. Anime distributor Funimation streamed English subtitled episodes four days after the Japanese air dates on both its website and its YouTube channel. Funimation suspended streaming of the series for a few weeks in May following the accidental leak of an episode of One Piece from its servers before it had aired in Japan. All episodes were also available on American subscription service Hulu, showing 14 days after their original airing, as well as via Australia's Madman Entertainment. English dubbed episodes of the series started premiering on American cable network Adult Swim from February 14, 2010, onwards, at 12:00 a.m. ET as part of their late night Saturday anime block.

Aniplex began releasing the series in DVD and Blu-ray on August 26, 2009. The first one contains two episodes and an original video animation (OVA). Three more OVAs were included in the fifth, ninth and thirteenth volumes alongside four episodes. Other volumes feature four episodes and no OVAs. A total of sixteen volumes were released, with the last one on November 24, 2010. Funimation released the episodes on Blu-ray and DVD in five volumes, each of thirteen episodes on May 25, 2010.

Brotherhood'''s music composer is Akira Senju. Ten pieces of theme music were used in Brotherhood''. From episode 15–26, the respective opening and ending themes are "Hologram" by Nico Touches the Walls, and "Let It Out" by Miho Fukuhara. While episodes 63 and 64 do not use opening themes, they use "Rain" and "Hologram", respectively, for the endings.


Episode list

OVAs

Home media release

Japanese

English

Notes

References
General

Specific

External links

Aniplex's official Fullmetal Alchemist website  
Official Fullmetal Alchemist Brotherhood website 

Episodes
Fullmetal Alchemist